Spanova is a Japanese music duo formed by Ken and Shin Tasaki. The brothers started composing and playing instruments together from the very early age, absorbing every kinds of music they were exposed; from 1970s an 1980s Pop and Rock as they always enjoyed on the radio; to Jazz, Soul, Bossa Nova, Hip-Hop, and Modern Music as they get fascinated by the sounds from the unknown world.  Starting their career as composers in late 1990s, the duo issued their debut album under their own unit name Spanova on WEA Japan in 1997. Since then, the duo has been exploring their music at their private recording studio "Daily Planet Studio", working on all process by themselves from making demos to the final mixes. While playing an active role in Japanese pop scene as composers and producers, they started with more experimental works in early 2000s, building materials into a unique and sensitive sonic texture instead of having a straightforward vocals or an acoustic instrument, and arranging them into an organic piece.

In 2006, they contributed their song "Absentminded" to the 10th anniversary compilation album "History Is Bunk" for the Chicago-based electronica label Hefty Records, along with Savath & Savalas(Scott Herren), and other Japanese musicians such as Ryuichi Sakamoto and Haruomi Hosono.

The duo is expanding their music experiment to the collaborative projects with various artists from different field and drawing more attention from the Crossover (music)/Electronica scene worldwide.

Members
Ken Tasaki
Shin Tasaki

Discography

Albums

Singles

Soundtrack

As composer, producer on other artists' albums

Remixes

Compilations

Other collaborations

TV/Web commercials

References

External links
Spanova Official web site

Japanese rock music groups